
The Brazilian Chess Confederation is the national governing body for chess in Brazil and a member of the International Chess Federation (usually referred to as FIDE).

The organization was founded on November 11, 1924 as the Federação Brasileira de Xadrez (Brazilian Chess Federation) and affiliated with FIDE in 1935. It is based in Santa Maria de Jetibá, Espírito Santo. Its president is Darcy Lima, who took office in 2013. It has 19 constituent clubs and 30,000 members.

Chess in Brazil is more popular in the South and Southeast than in the Northeast, and the confederation and its member associations have been affected by competition from online chess.

Administration

See also
:Category:Brazilian chess players

References

External links
 

Brazil
Chess in Brazil
Chess
1924 establishments in Brazil
Sports organizations established in 1924
Chess organizations
1924 in chess